Chatham Town Hall is a municipal building in Dock Road in Chatham, Kent, England. The town hall, which was the headquarters of Chatham Borough Council, is a Grade II listed building.

History

Following the incorporation of Chatham as a municipal borough on 10 December 1890, civic leaders decided to procure a dedicated town hall: the site they selected was a plot of vacant land, which was owned by the War Office, located just to the south east of what was then a military storehouse.

The site was acquired and construction of the new building started in 1898. It was designed by George Edward Bond in the Renaissance style and opened in January 1900. The design involved an asymmetrical main frontage with five bays facing onto Dock Road; the central section of three bays, which slightly projected forward, featured four round headed widows on the ground floor, the borough coat of arms with three sash windows above on the first floor, a large round headed window on the second floor and a pediment containing a carving with the year "1899" above. At roof level the architect erected figures depicting justice, Britannia, agriculture and music. The section of three bays on the left, on the corner with Barrier Road, featured round headed doorways on the ground floor, a loggia with round headed openings on the first floor, sash windows on the second floor, flanked by Corinthian order columns which spanned the second and third floors, and a parapet above. Beyond that, there was a three-stage clock tower with a domed cupola.

The principal rooms, which were on the first floor, were the mayor's parlour (on the left of the building), the council chamber (on the left of the building at the rear) and a large assembly hall with a proscenium arch (on the right of the building). In the 1930s, in anticipation of the Second World War, the local civil defence headquarters was established in the basement of the building. The town hall was the venue for various scenes in the satirical comedy film, Left Right and Centre, starring Ian Carmichael, in 1959.

The town hall served as the headquarters of Chatham Borough Council but ceased to be the local seat of government when the enlarged Medway Borough Council was formed with its headquarters at Gun Wharf in 1974. With the promotional motto "Putting The Arts Back Into The Medway", the town hall became the Medway Arts Centre in May 1987. It hosted concerts by rock bands such as My Bloody Valentine in January 1988 and went on to become the Brook Theatre, with a focus on children's theatre productions, in April 1997.

References

City and town halls in Kent
Government buildings completed in 1900
Government buildings with domes
Grade II listed buildings in Kent
Chatham, Kent